The architecture of Cantabria has a long history. In medieval times, artistic individuality was subordinated to ingenuity in civil works.  Late Gothic, Plateresque, and Renaissance architecture later played a role in Cantabrian architecture, as did the province's mountain quarries. The contemporary era is dominated by a regional architectural tradition that incorporates diverse influences from around the world.

The traditional mountain architecture of Cantabria, even with its differing local varieties, is a cultural heritage that has been preserved over time. These forms are based on a way of understanding architecture and applied materials, harmony with the Cantabrian environment and climate, and the continuation of ancestral customs. Within this vernacular architecture, the Cantabrian house stands out as the most traditional and typical. Cantabrian houses range from humble shepherd huts to the palaces and mountain mansions of the rich, from traditional mountain homes to the modest huts of the Pas valley.

See also
Spanish architecture

Cantabrian culture
Architecture in Spain
Buildings and structures in Cantabria